Chen Zunrong (born October 20, 1962) is a retired Chinese long jumper, best known for finishing tenth at the 1992 Olympic Games. His personal best is 8.36 metres, achieved in May 1992 in Shizuoka.

Achievements

References

1962 births
Living people
Athletes (track and field) at the 1988 Summer Olympics
Athletes (track and field) at the 1992 Summer Olympics
Chinese male long jumpers
Olympic athletes of China
Asian Games medalists in athletics (track and field)
Athletes (track and field) at the 1986 Asian Games
Athletes (track and field) at the 1990 Asian Games
Asian Games gold medalists for China
Asian Games bronze medalists for China
Medalists at the 1986 Asian Games
Medalists at the 1990 Asian Games
People from Yongchun County
Sportspeople from Quanzhou